Ambazac is a commune in the Haute-Vienne department in the Nouvelle-Aquitaine region in western France.

Population

Personalities
 Maurice Boitel, painter artist, he painted in Ambazac between 1947 et 1996
 Raymond Desèze, barrister and member of the Académie française 
 Canon Landon, épigraphist and Latinist, priest of Ambazac
 Catherine Cesarsky, astrophysicist
 Albert Besson, bacteriologist

Partner Communities
  Eckental (Germany), since 1987
  Soufflenheim (Alsace)

See also
 Communes of the Haute-Vienne department

References

 

Communes of Haute-Vienne
County of La Marche